The following is a list of women who have reached general, flag or air officer rank in the Royal Navy, British Army and Royal Air Force, not including those given honorary ranks. An air commodore is considered an air officer rank. Those who have reached the rank of brigadier or commodore and above are included in this list.

Royal Navy

British Army

Royal Air Force

References

Senior female officers
Armed Forces,Senior officers

United Kingdom
United Kingdom
United Kingdom